Oscar Ihlebæk (9 October 1900 – 10 March 1945) was a Norwegian newspaper editor and resistance member.

History 
Ihlebæk was born in Drammen, to a mother from Skoger and a father from Rakkestad. In 1926 he married Fredrikke Wium from Drammen, and they had two children. At the time he resided in Asker where he chaired the local Socialist Youth League chapter.

He had secondary education. He was promoted to editor-in-chief in 1939. He was a board member of the Norwegian Press Association from 1936, and from 1939 he was a deputy board member in Den Nationale Scene.

During the occupation of Norway by Nazi Germany he was fired by the Nazi authorities in November 1940. He joined the Norwegian resistance movement, but was captured. He was imprisoned in Espeland concentration camp from 29 January 1943, then Grini concentration camp from 11 May 1943. In the winter he was sent to Germany. He was held in Sachsenhausen concentration camp from 15 December 1943, then Gross-Rosen concentration camp from 26 December 1944. He was later moved to Bergen-Belsen, where he died.

References 

1900 births
1945 deaths
People from Drammen
Norwegian newspaper editors
Norwegian resistance members
Resistance members who died in Nazi concentration camps
Espeland concentration camp prisoners
Grini concentration camp prisoners
Sachsenhausen concentration camp prisoners
Norwegian people who died in Bergen-Belsen concentration camp
20th-century Norwegian writers